Cesare Aretusi (1 September 1549 – 4 October 1612) was an Italian painter of the late-Renaissance period.

He was born in Modena and  trained with Bartolomeo Ramenghi (Bagnacavallo). Known primarily as a portrait painter, Aretusi also  painted the cupola of the cathedral of St. Peter in Bologna, where he was assisted by Giovanni Battista Fiorini. Aretusi is described by Lanzi as the better colorist, while Fiorini, the better designer. Aretusi restored the frescoes of Correggio for the tribune of the Cathedral of Parma, and made a copy of the famous La Notte painting by Correggio for the church of San Giovanni Evangelista in Parma. He died in 1612 in Parma.

The relationship of Cesare to the Modenese painters with the same surname, Pellegrino from the early 16th century or Alessandro Aretusi from the 17th, is unclear. Lanzi speculates he may have been the son of Pellegrino Aretusi.

References

1580s births
1612 deaths
16th-century Italian painters
Italian male painters
17th-century Italian painters
Painters from Modena
Italian Mannerist painters
Fresco painters